The 2013 V8SuperTourer season is a motor racing championship for touring cars held in New Zealand. The season started on 16 February at Hampton Downs Motorsport Park and ended on 8 December at Pukekohe Park Raceway after seven rounds. All cars used a chassis built by Paul Ceprnich of Pace Innovations in Australia, and were powered by a Chevrolet LS7 7-litre engine.

While the chassis and engines are the same (to provide a level playing field and hopefully allow the best drivers to succeed due to talent, not equipment), the cars can 'wear' body panels from any suitable model. So far, cars have appeared as either the Ford Falcon or Holden Commodore, but the chassis has a generic enough shape that a manufacturer such as Toyota or BMW could likely fit their bodywork to a Supertourer chassis and race as Lexus or 5 Series model.

There were to be 24 cars on the grid in Round 1 at Hampton Downs Motorsport Park with talks that there also may be a Hyundai on the grid as well. It was confirmed that New Zealand Business BNT Automotive would be the official sponsor of the V8SuperTourer.

Scott McLaughlin started the season as the defending drivers' champion.

Calendar
The 2013 V8SuperTourer season consisted of seven rounds, although only six were confirmed. The dates for round 6 were set for 9 and 10 November:

Key:

Teams and drivers

The following teams and drivers competed during the 2013 V8SuperTourer season.

Results
The season started at Hampton Downs Motorsport Park and finished at Pukekohe Park Raceway for the annual Pukekohe 500.

Event summaries

The Rock Rumble

Greg Murphy won all three of the races at the season opener at Hampton Downs Motorsport Park continuing his great form at the North Waikato Track. Ant Pedersen also shone at the season opener claiming Pole Position and two second placings, a great result for the young driver from International Motorsport. The event also saw Front Running Kiwi V8 Supercar Driver Shane van Gisbergen join the series, in one of the MPC Motorsport Cars; he would eventually finish third for the round.

Mike Pero Need for Speed

Round 2 of the Series at Ruapuna saw Ant Pedersen claim another Pole Position, this time over Shane van Gisbergen. But Ant Pedersen wasn't the only Ford driver with speed, Tasman Motorsports driver Daniel Gaunt managed to claim the first two races then finishing Race 3 in second giving the Ford driver the Round Victory. Championship Leader Greg Murphy finished second in the first two races but had car troubles in the final giving him a DNF and dropping him to 6th in the Round.

Brother 350

Round 3 of the Series was held at the home of New Zealand Motorsport Pukekohe Park Raceway, where everyone thought hometown hero Greg Murphy would clean up, which wasn't the case. Shane van Gisbergen dominated the weekend claiming Pole then the first two races before Greg Murphy snatched the last race but because of the two victories Shane held on for the Round Victory. Resigning Champion Scott McLaughlin returned to the podium for the first time in 2013 claiming two-thirds and a fourth.

Gull 250

Round 4 of the Series was the final Sprint Series Round which was held in Taupo, where the fight was between Greg Murphy and Ant Pedersen for the Sprint Series Crown. Scott McLaughlin showed fantastic speed all weekend claiming both Pole Positions, but sadly had rotten luck in the races including a big start line crash in Race 3. Shane van Gisbergen eventually won the round over Andy Booth (who won Race 3) and Ant Pedersen (who won Race 2), but sadly for Ant he didn't get the points he needed to stop Greg Murphy from winning the 2013 Sprint Series Championship.

Aegis Oils Waikato 400

Round 5 of the season was the first Endurance Season round with many Australian Drivers making the trip to come over. The weekend saw different race winners for each race with Hampton Downs King Greg Murphy taking out Race 1 with 2012 co-driver Jack Perkins, Race 2 saw Tim Edgell and Lee Holdsworth claim their first race wins in V8SuperTourer. Then in Race 3 the International Motorsport duo of Ant Pedersen and Chaz Mostert managed to win. Because of great consistency Shane van Gisbergen and Alex Davison managed to win the round, the third round win in a row for Shane.

Hampton 400

Round 6 of the season saw many of the same results as Round 6 with Greg Murphy taking out Race 1 with Jack Perkins, Race 2 saw Richard Moore and Tim Slade claim their first race wins in V8SuperTourer. Then in Race 3 the International Motorsport duo of Ant Pedersen and Chaz Mostert managed to win the final race again just like Round 5, but this team the Ford drivers of Ant and Chaz also claimed the round, giving Ant Pedersen the overall Series lead over Greg Murphy going into the final round.

Mike Pero 500

The Mike Pero 500 was the 7th and final round of the 2013 V8 SuperTourer Championship which ended up coming down between Ant Pedersen, Greg Murphy and Shane van Gisbergen. The first race saw Shane van Gisbergen take the first strike at the title winning Race 1 with Alex Davison before having car troubles putting them out of Race 2 and 3 and ending his hopes at the title leaving it between Greg Murphy and Ant Pedersen. After the first race Greg Murphy managed to take over the Series lead after finishing second; then in Race 2 Ant Pedersen retook the lead of the Series by 45 points. Then in the final race Greg Murphy managed to finish second with Ant Pedersen finishing 5th giving Murphy the 2013 Crown. The weekend also saw Scott McLaughlin return to the winners' circle claiming his first and only race win of the season with James Moffat alongside him.

Championship standings

Drivers' Championship

Endurance Series standings

See also
V8SuperTourer

References

External links
 V8SuperTourers New Zealand
 V8SuperTourer News on Speedstuff

2013 in New Zealand motorsport